, also known as You Were Like a Wild Chrysanthemum or My First Love Affair, is a 1955 Japanese drama film directed by Keisuke Kinoshita. It is based on a novel by Saicho Ito.

Plot
73-year-old Masao is taking a river boat to pay his remote home village a visit. On his way, he reminiscences in flashbacks his youth during the Meiji era and his first great love Tamiko.

Tamiko works in the household of cousin Masao's parents. The families and the villagers are suspicious of the close, yet innocent relationship between the teenagers. While some people mock their spending time together, Tamiko's sister-in-law acts openly hostile. The contact between the two is more and more inhibited, and after Masao is sent away to a higher school in another town, Tamiko is pressured into an unwanted marriage. Tamiko first resists, but when Masao's mother declares that she will under no circumstances allow her to marry her son, she finally gives in. Omasu, the housemaid, meets Masao and gives him the news, at the same time reminding him that Tamiko will always love him. A few months later, Masao receives a telegram by his mother, asking him to come home quickly. Upon returning, he learns of Tamiko's unhappy marriage, divorce, and recent death due to an illness. The family, grieving the loss, tells Masao that the dead Tamiko held a letter from him in her hand, pressed against her heart.

Again in the present, the old Masao has reached his destination and visits Tamiko's grave, contemplating her fate with the words, "late autumn and the fields are lonesome, only crickets sing by her grave".

Cast
Chishū Ryū as Masao at 73 years
Noriko Arita as Tamiko
Shinji Tanaka as young Masao
Haruko Sugimura as Masao's mother
Takahiro Tamura as Eizo
Toshiko Kobayashi as Omasu, the maid
Kappei Matsumoto 
Kazuko Motohashi as Tamiko's mother
Nobuo Takagi as Tamiko's father
Kumeko Urabe as grandmother
Keiko Yukishiro as Tamiko's sister-in-law

Production
The flashback scenes were filmed using an oval-shaped mask typically associated with silent films. According to Alexander Jacoby, this masking gives the film "an appropriately nostalgic tone."  Film critic Donald Richie describes the film style as representing "Meiji daguerrotypes."

Reception
Jacoby rates She Was Like a Wild Chrysanthemum to be "among the most purely moving of Japanese films" despite its "occasional naivety."  He attributes this particularly to Kinoshota's "simple techniques," including "judicious choice of camera position," and to the excellent performances.  Richie regards the film as one of Kinoshita's "most successful" in his later style.  Joseph L. Anderson praises the film's photography, particularly the "rich blacks" and Kinoshita's "evocation of [the] area."  Jacek Kloiowski, et al., regard the film as "one of the most sincere and purest films of its type in Japanese cinema," noting that it marks a return to "pastoral lyricism" for Kinoshota after focusing his films on social issues for the previous few years.

Awards
Cinematographer Hiroshi Kusuda won the Mainichi Film Award for cinematography in 1956 for his work on She Was Like a Wild Chrysanthemum and another Kinoshita–directed film, The Tattered Wings. He also won the Blue Ribbon Award for cinematography for the same two films.

References

External links

1955 films
1955 drama films
1950s Japanese-language films
Japanese drama films
Japanese black-and-white films
Shochiku films
Films directed by Keisuke Kinoshita
Films set in the Meiji period
Films with screenplays by Keisuke Kinoshita
1950s Japanese films